Arthur der Weduwen is a Dutch historian and writer. His work primarily focuses on the Dutch Republic, the history of the book and the emergence of the newspaper.

Educated at the University of Exeter, der Weduwen took his doctoral degree at St Andrews University, where he currently works on the Universal Short Title Catalogue Project. He is a Fellow of the Royal Historical Society.

Career 
His book Dutch and Flemish Newspapers of the Seventeenth Century, 1618-1700, published in 2017 in two volumes, provided the first complete survey of newspapers published in the Low Countries at the beginning of serial news publication. The book was well received by academics, and awarded a Menno Hertzberger Prize in 2019.

Der Weduwen has collaborated with Andrew Pettegree on a number of books about the publishing industry in the Netherlands in the Dutch Golden Age.  These include The Bookshop of the World. Making and Trading Books in the Dutch Golden Age (2019) in English and Dutch, and studies of the origins of advertising, The Dutch Republic and the Birth of Modern Advertising and News and Business and Public Information. Advertisements and Public Announcements in Dutch and Flemish Newspapers, 1620-1675.  They also co-wrote The Library: a Fragile History (2021) which charts the history of the library from the ancient world to the modern era.

Publications

References

External links
 

21st-century Dutch historians
Reformation historians
Living people
Year of birth missing (living people)
Alumni of the University of Exeter
Fellows of the Royal Historical Society